Montrécourt is a commune in the Nord department in northern France.

It is one of the smallest, least populated communes of Nord.

Heraldry

See also
Communes of the Nord department

References

Communes of Nord (French department)